

Professor X

Xavin

X-Cutioner
The X-Cutioner (Carl Denti) is a fictional character, a former FBI agent obsessed with stalking mutants who kill humans. He uses an array of both alien technology (such as Shi'ar power armor and Z'nox sensors) and Earthly technology (such as Sentinel propulsion units) in his quest. Created by Scott Lobdell, he first appeared in The Uncanny X-Men Annual #17 (1993).

Denti's father was an army officer murdered for following an illegal order, which would later interfere with his crusade against mutants. Eventually becoming an F.B.I. officer, Denti partners with a contact of Charles Xavier's, Fred Duncan, a member of the mutant supporter network known as the Xavier Underground who maintains mutant criminal records and stockpiles the weapons and technology of X-Men foes. Denti takes the files, weapons, and technology for himself and assumes the name X-Cutioner, with the proclaimed mission of killing any mutant that has killed other people first. Denti is so "dedicated" to his mission that he will use lethal force to stop anyone obstructing his lethal "justice".

His first successful target is the mutant Tower, followed by an unsuccessful attempt on Mastermind, who was detained on Muir Island. Mastermind survives only to die of natural causes, because the X-Cutioner was delayed when he encountered the X-Men. He next targets the White Queen, only to be stopped by the father-and-son duo of Cyclops and Cable. Later, he tracks down Skin for the murder of Angelo Espinosa, not knowing that the two boys were the same person. Working through the ranks of X-Men characters, he next encounters the Punisher, Rogue, X-Man, and Gambit. After teaming up with Gambit, Denti encounters a new X-Cutioner with similar technology.

A normal human with specialized training, X-Cutioner's weapons and technology include alien Z'nox sensors, Sentinel propulsion units for flight, Shi'ar body armor, a personal force field, a teleportation unit and various other weapons.

Xemnu

Xi'an

Xi'an (Xi'an Chi Xan) was created for the Marvel 2099 imprint. The character was created by John Francis Moore and Ron Lim, and first appeared in X-Men 2099 #1. He is the founder and has been a leader and enemy of the 2099 X-Men.

Xi'an was born into a well-respected family. However, when his mutant power to break down the molecular structure of whatever he touches with his left hand manifested, his parents turned him over to a genetics lab to save their own reputation. Before reaching the lab, Xi'an destroyed his restraints and escaped. He spent much of the rest of his youth on the streets, in and out of gangs before joining The Lawless, gaining the nickname "The Desert Ghost". After being chased by bounty hunters in Saigon, Xi'an left the Lawless and returned to the US, with a more refined demeanor and a new purpose, to create his own version of the X-Men to help fight for genetic equality.

The team almost immediately runs into trouble when Xi'an is accused of murdering casino mogul Noah Synge. The team hurries to clear his name, but in the course of things Xi'an is shot. Instead of dying his body encases itself in a cocoon. He soon emerges from this cocoon fully healed. This trauma also triggers a secondary mutation, giving Xi'an the power to heal with his right hand.

Xi'an then leads the team to find Mama Hurricane, who was a runner for the mutant underground railroad during The Great Purge of mutants some decades prior. They find her and gain knowledge on the Driver, her next contact within the railroad, but are then sidetracked to El Paso, where Krystalin has uncovered evidence of an "Archangel"-like mutant. They discover a hidden base where Master Zhao, the leader of the last known X-Men cell, has kidnapped Krys and Xi'an's former Lawless teammate Victor Ten Eagles. Over the years, Zhao has made himself mentally unstable with psych-drugs and plans to brainwash Xi'an's team into his own X-Men. However, in his initial assault on Xi'an's mind it is revealed that Xi'an's prior Lawless personality has been laying dormant, as a sort of alternate personality. In order to defeat Zhao, Xi'an returns to his more amoral personality, knocking the former mutant leader into a coma with a psychic backlash.

Having returned to his old ways, Xi'an leaves the team, attempting to locate the Driver on his own, though he is followed by Skullfire. After finding the Driver, they are attacked by Brimstone Love, leader of the Theatre of Pain. Xi'an joins the Theatre, returning to El Paso to steal the bodies of Zhao and his failed attempt at genetically creating X-Men with powers similar to the originals, One-Eyed Jack, Psycho K and Wingspan.

During his initiation into the Theatre, Xi'an was forced to relive some of his most traumatic memories, fighting holographically produced villains from his past. As a final rite of passage he refuses the aid of his moral half and is dubbed Controller X. Using the psychic energy of the comatose Zhao, Xi'an creates a symphony of suffering and pain for the Theatre on a scale they had not seen before. During the performance, the team of X-Men he had created infiltrate the Theatre and rescue him. New X-Man and former Theatre of Pain slave La Lunatica uses her mutant ability to bring to the surface all of Xi'an's past and present misdeeds, finally balancing his turbulent psyche, reverting him to his calm and moral self. With this comes the revelation of all he has done and a heavy-hearted need to atone for his sins.

Xi'an then travels with the X-Men to the mutant City-State of Halo City, where he leaves the team to open a clinic and heal people with his powers.  He briefly rejoins his remaining Lawless brethren; Auntie Maim, Mongrel and Victor Ten Eagles, to escape The Foolkiller, a human hunting down members of The Lawless for their part in the massacre of his hometown.

With the rest of humanity, Xi'an retreats to the Savage Land as the polar ice caps begin to melt and flood the world. He helps to rebuild civilization, often getting in heated arguments with the surviving humans. His long-time friend Victor Ten Eagles attempts to help him while Morphine Somers attempts to disrupt the fragile peace within the Last Refuge, believing mutants should rule by right of genetic superiority. The remaining humans band together but the series is cancelled before more of the storyline can be explored.

In the finale one-shot of the 2099 continuity, Manifest Destiny, Xi'an is a leading figure at the Savage Land refuge, now named the Xavier Colony.

X-Man

Xorn

X-Ray

X-23

References

Marvel Comics characters: X, List of